Neyshaburak (also Romanized as Neyshābūrak and Nīshābūrak) is a village in Pasakuh Rural District, Zavin District, Kalat County, Razavi Khorasan Province, Iran. At the 2006 census, its population was 22, in 5 families.

References 

Populated places in Kalat County